Idaea infirmaria is a moth of the family Geometridae. It is found in Southern Europe.

References

External links

Fauna Europaea
Lepiforum.de

Sterrhini
Moths of Europe
Taxa named by Jules Pierre Rambur
Moths described in 1833